Carlene Carter is an American country music artist. Her discography comprises nine studio albums, two compilation albums, 26 singles, and 10 music videos.

Studio albums

Compilation albums

Singles

As lead artist

As featured artist

Music videos

References

Discographies of American artists
Country music discographies